Majed Sobhi Osman (born 9 June 1994) is a professional footballer who plays as an attacking midfielder or winger for Indonesian club Dewa United and the Lebanon national team.

After playing in the lower divisions of English and American football, Osman joined Safa in Lebanese Premier League in summer 2019. Following the cancellation of the 2019–20 season, Osman moved to Jordan at Al-Ramtha in February 2020, helping them to a third-place finish in his first season. He returned to Lebanon in summer 2021, signing for reigning champions Ansar, before moving to Dewa United in Indonesia.

Born in England to an English mother, Osman also holds Lebanese citizenship on account of having a Lebanese father. He made his debut for the Lebanon national team in 2021.

Early life
Osman was born in Hammersmith, Greater London, England, to Lebanese father Sobhi and English mother Linda. He attended the International School of London, while playing for the Brentford FC Community Sports Trust (Brentford FC CST). Osman has a brother, and is a practicing Muslim.

Youth and college career 
Osman began his youth career at the Brentford FC CST when he was about 12 years old, before moving to the United States in 2012, where he played college football for West Virginia Mountaineers. He scored three goals in 12 games in 2012, and five goals in 15 games the next season. Osman was part of the All-Mid-American Conference (MAC) First Team in 2013.

In 2014 Osman moved to Xavier Musketeers, Xavier University's varsity sports team. However, due to an injury, he was ruled out of the 2014 season. He debuted in the 2015 season, scoring two goals in 18 games; in 2016 he scored two goals in 19 games. In summer 2017, Osman returned to England, joining Morecambe's under-23 team.

Club career

Early career 
Osman began his senior career in the United States in 2015 at Premier Development League (PDL) club FC Tucson, scoring on his debut on 16 May 2015. While training for Morecambe, on 25 September 2017 Osman joined Northern Premier League (NPL) Premier Division club Rushall Olympic. On 11 November 2017, he moved to Airbus UK Broughton in the Cymru Alliance.

Corinthian-Casuals 
In 2018, Osman moved to Isthmian League side Corinthian-Casuals. He scored his first league goal on 2 March 2019, in a 2–2 draw against Haringey Borough. On 13 April 2019, Osman scored a brace against Wingate & Finchley, helping his side win 3–1. Osman scored a total of four goals in 16 league games during the 2018–19 season.

Safa 
On 22 July 2019, Osman joined Lebanese Premier League side Safa. He featured for the club in all three 2019–20 league games to date, before the season was cancelled due to the ongoing economic crisis in Lebanon and the impending arrival of the coronavirus pandemic.

Al-Ramtha 
On 26 February 2020, Osman moved to Jordanian Pro League club Al-Ramtha on a one-and-a-half-year contract. He made his debut in the league on 6 March 2020, against defending champions Al-Faisaly in a 0–0 draw away from home. Osman scored his first goal against Al-Wehdat in the league on 10 September 2020, in a 1–0 victory. His first league assist came on 19 September, in a 2–1 home win against Shabab Al-Ordon. Osman played 21 league games during the 2020 season, missing one game for being positive to COVID-19; he helped Al-Ramtha finish in third place, and had his contract extended a further six months.

On 10 May 2021, Osman scored a brace in the 2021 Jordanian Pro League through two long-range efforts, helping Al-Ramtha beat Al-Hussein 5–1 at home. Osman refused to be called-up for Al-Ramtha's game against Al-Baqa'a on 26 June, following financial disagreements with the club. He left for Lebanon the following day.

Ansar 
On 20 July 2021, Lebanese Premier League reigning-champions Ansar announced the signing of Osman. He played 17 league games for Ansar, scoring once on 29 April 2022, in a 1–1 draw against Ahed. Osman also appeared in the 2022 AFC Cup, playing all three group-stage games.

Dewa United 
On 13 July 2022, Osman joined Dewa United of the Indonesian Liga 1. He debuted on 7 August against Persita, losing 1–0 away from home. He scored and assisted both of Dewa United's goals against PSIS Semarang on 29 August; despite being down to 10 men, Dewa United won 2–1.

International career 
Eligible to represent Lebanon internationally through his father, Osman was first called up to the national team for a training camp in the United Arab Emirates, to be held between 9 and 17 November 2020. However, as he tested positive for COVID-19, he was unable to join the camp. Osman made his debut on 29 March 2021, coming on as an 84th-minute substitute for Bassel Jradi in a 1–1 friendly draw against Kuwait.

Career statistics

International

Honours 
Al-Ramtha
 Jordanian Pro League: 2021

Ansar
 Lebanese Super Cup: 2021
 Lebanese FA Cup runner-up: 2021–22

Individual
 All-MAC First Team: 2013

See also 
 List of Lebanon international footballers born outside Lebanon

References

External links

 
 

1994 births
Living people
Footballers from Hammersmith
English footballers
Lebanese footballers
English people of Lebanese descent
Lebanese people of English descent
Sportspeople of Lebanese descent
Association football midfielders
Brentford F.C. players
West Virginia Mountaineers men's soccer players
FC Tucson players
Xavier Musketeers men's soccer players
Rushall Olympic F.C. players
Morecambe F.C. players
Cymru Alliance players
Airbus UK Broughton F.C. players
Corinthian-Casuals F.C. players
Safa SC players
Al-Ramtha SC players
Al Ansar FC players
Dewa United F.C. players
USL League Two players
Northern Premier League players
Isthmian League players
Lebanese Premier League players
Jordanian Pro League players
Liga 1 (Indonesia) players
Lebanon international footballers
English expatriate footballers
English expatriate sportspeople in the United States
English expatriate sportspeople in Jordan
English expatriate sportspeople in Indonesia
Lebanese expatriate footballers
Lebanese expatriate sportspeople in the United States
Lebanese expatriate sportspeople in Jordan
Lebanese expatriate sportspeople in Indonesia
Expatriate soccer players in the United States
Expatriate footballers in Jordan
Expatriate footballers in Indonesia
English Muslims
Lebanese Muslims